Metal regulatory transcription factor 1 is a protein that in humans is encoded by the MTF1 gene.

Function 

This gene encodes a transcription factor that induces expression of metallothioneins and other genes involved in metal homeostasis in response to heavy metals such as cadmium, zinc, copper, and silver. The protein is a nucleocytoplasmic shuttling protein that accumulates in the nucleus upon heavy metal exposure and binds to promoters containing a metal-responsive element (MRE).

References

Further reading

External links 
 

Transcription factors